Pradeep Kumar G. is an Indian cell biologist and a scientist at the Rajiv Gandhi Centre for Biotechnology. Known for his studies in the field of disease biology, Dr Kumar is a life member of the Kerala Academy of Sciences. The Department of Biotechnology of the Government of India awarded him the National Bioscience Award for Career Development, one of the highest Indian science awards, for his contributions to biosciences in 2006. He has also been conferred with the prestigious Labhsetwar Award (2015) and the Dr. TC Anand Kumar Memorial Oration Award (2016) of the Indian Society for the Study of Reproduction and Fertility (ISSRF) and the Subhas Mukherjee Memorial Oration Award (2017) of the Academy of Clinical Embryologists.

Biography 

Pradeep Kumar G., born in the Alappuzha district of Kerala, did his post-graduate studies at the University of Kerala and after earning an MSc in zoology in 1984, he moved to the Devi Ahilya Vishwavidyalaya for his doctoral studies on the biophysics of sperm membranes to secure a PhD in 1988. Subsequently, he started his career by joining the same institution as a member of faculty in 1989. He served the institution holding the positions of a lecturer, senior lecturer (1994) and reader (1999) and, in between, completed his post-doctoral work at the Centre for Biomedical Research of the Rockefeller University and University of Virginia. In 2004, he returned to his home state of Kerala to set up his laboratory at the Division of Molecular Reproduction of the Rajiv Gandhi Centre for Biotechnology (RGCB) where he is a senior faculty, holding the position of a Scientist Grade G. he is also a visiting faculty at the University of Virginia and the University of Florida.

Kumar's research at RGCB is focused on molecular reproduction and he heads a group of scientists working on reproductive genomics and proteomics. He is reported to have done advanced research on the development and differentiation of germ cells in mammalian testis and his work has widened the understanding of Primordial Germ Cells (PGCs) and their differentiation. His studies have been documented by way of a number of articles and ResearchGate, an online repository of scientific articles has listed 128 of them. Besides, he has contributed chapters to books published by others. He holds a US and international patent on Activators of Cyclin-Dependent Kinases (ACDK) and has mentored many doctoral scholars in their studies.

Kumar is a member of the executive committee of the Indian Society for the Study of Reproduction and Fertility (ISSRF)
and a life member of the Kerala Academy of Sciences. The Department of Biotechnology of the Government of India awarded him the National Bioscience Award for Career Development, one of the highest Indian science awards in 2006. He is also a recipient of the 2015 Labshetwar Award of the Indian Society for the Study of Reproduction and Fertility.

Personal life 
Kumar currently resides in Thiruvananthapuram along with his wife Dr Malini Laloraya,a fellow scientist herself.

Selected bibliography

See also 

 Cellular differentiation
 Meiosis

Notes

References

External links 
 

N-BIOS Prize recipients
Indian scientific authors
Living people
Fellows of the Indian Academy of Sciences
Indian cell biologists
Indian patent holders
Fellows of The National Academy of Sciences, India
Fellows of the Indian National Science Academy
Academic staff of the Indian Institute of Science
Scientists from Kerala
University of Kerala alumni
Rockefeller University alumni
University of Virginia faculty
University of Florida faculty
1962 births
21st-century Indian inventors